15 Days is a casual adventure game developed by German independent developer House of Tales and published by DTP Entertainment. It was released for Microsoft Windows on 25 June 2010.

Gameplay 
The player controls three characters who are art thieves that steal artwork and give the money they make to charity.

Development 
The game engine developed by House of Tales allowed the developers to use tracking shots and pans which are usually impossible with pre-rendered backgrounds.

Reception 
According to review aggregator Metacritic, 15 Days has a score of 63 based on six reviews.

In a one-and-a-half-star review ("poor"), Adventure Gamers criticized the game for its gameplay, bugs and lack of content, stating there were only two standalone puzzles and that the most of the game is just walking between rooms looking for something to do.  When you meet an NPC person to talk to, you just click a single dialog icon and they tell a player something, without any other interaction on the player's part, no choices for what to say at all.

GameStar felt the game's puzzles were too simple for adventure gaming aficionados. Gameswelt praised the appealing and authentic nature of the game's aesthetics.

References 

2010 video games
Adventure games
House of Tales games
Video games developed in Germany
Windows games
Windows-only games
Indie video games
DTP Entertainment games